Liu Qiuhong (born November 26, 1988 in Mudanjiang, Heilongjiang) is a Chinese female short track speed skater.

Liu made her Olympic debut in Vancouver, skating in all four events: 500m, 1000m, 1500m and 3000m relay. Liu is considered the second-fastest Chinese skater, behind Wang Meng.

In the 2008 ISU world championships, Liu won the silver medal in lady's 500 meter final, and has been a key contributor to China's successful relay efforts. Despite being her least favorite event, Liu's biggest success on the World Cup circuit in the fall of 2009 came in the 1500m, where she was ranked fifth overall and closed out the season with a third-place in Montreal followed by a runner-up finish in Marquette. China's relay team won the last three competitions of the season, and Liu was a member of each of those squads.

References

1988 births
Living people
Chinese female speed skaters
Chinese female short track speed skaters
Olympic short track speed skaters of China
Short track speed skaters at the 2014 Winter Olympics
Asian Games medalists in short track speed skating
Asian Games gold medalists for China
Asian Games bronze medalists for China
Short track speed skaters at the 2011 Asian Winter Games
Medalists at the 2011 Asian Winter Games
Universiade medalists in short track speed skating
Medalists at the 2007 Winter Universiade
Sportspeople from Heilongjiang
People from Mudanjiang
Universiade gold medalists for China
Universiade silver medalists for China
Competitors at the 2007 Winter Universiade
Competitors at the 2009 Winter Universiade
20th-century Chinese women
21st-century Chinese women